The Chief of Army is the most senior appointment in the Australian Army, responsible to both the Chief of the Defence Force (CDF) and the Secretary, Department of Defence (SECDEF). The rank associated with the position is lieutenant general (3-star).

Lieutenant General Simon Stuart, the incumbent Chief of Army, has held the post since 2 July 2022.

History
The first Commander of the Australian Army was titled General Officer Commanding, Australian Military Forces, in line with the usual British practice of the time. Experience soon showed that the position concentrated more power than the Ministers for Defence—of whom there were twelve in as many years in 1901–1913—liked. Moreover, the British Army had encountered administrative problems in the Second Boer War which led to the abolition of the position of Commander-in-Chief of the Forces there in 1904, and its replacement by an Army Board.

In 1904, Minister for Defence Anderson Dawson commissioned a report which recommended a similar system for Australia, with a board consisting of four military members, the minister, and a finance member. This was implemented by his successor, James Whiteside McCay. Instead of creating a Chief of the General Staff as per the report, McCay's Military Board consisted of only three military members, the Deputy Adjutant General, the Chief of Ordnance, and the Chief of Intelligence. 

The post of Chief of the General Staff was finally created by the new Minister of Defence, George Pearce, in 1909, with Colonel William Bridges becoming the first Chief of the General Staff. The military members of the Military Board then became the Chief of the General Staff, Adjutant General, Chief of Ordnance, and Quartermaster General.

During the Second World War, the threat of invasion led to a reversion to the old system. A Commander in Chief, General Sir Thomas Blamey, was appointed, and the Military Board was suspended, with its powers being transferred to the Commander in Chief. The post of Chief of the General Staff remained, but was now subordinate to the Commander in Chief. 

This was successful from a military point of view but the problem of a concentration of power recurred and, after the war ended, the government decided to re-form the Military Board. Blamey was replaced by Lieutenant General Vernon Sturdee in 1945 and the next year the post of Commander in Chief was again abolished, with Sturdee becoming Chief of the General Staff.

The system continued until the reforms of Arthur Tange in 1973. The three services were unified under the Department of Defence. The Military Board was abolished and the Chief of the General Staff became subordinate to the Chief of the Defence Force Staff and the Secretary of Defence. Reflecting this change from a staff to a command role, the post was renamed Chief of Army in 1997.

Appointees
The following table lists all those who have held the post of Chief of Army or its preceding positions. Ranks and honours are as at the completion of their tenure.

|-style="text-align:center;"
!colspan=6|General Officer Commanding Australian Military Forces

|-style="text-align:center;"
!colspan=6|Chief of the General Staff

|-style="text-align:center;"
!colspan=6|Chief of Army

See also
 List of Australian Army generals

References

Citations

Sources 

 
 
 

Australia
Australian Army
 
Leadership of the Australian Defence Force
Military appointments of Australia